Nanouche Lumbu Kuba (born 4 December 1988), known as Nanouche Lumbu, is a DR Congolese footballer who plays as a defender. She has been a member of the DR Congo women's national team.

International career
Lumbu capped for the DR Congo at senior level during the 2012 African Women's Championship.

See also
 List of Democratic Republic of the Congo women's international footballers

References

External links

1988 births
Living people
Footballers from Kinshasa
Democratic Republic of the Congo women's footballers
Women's association football defenders
Democratic Republic of the Congo women's international footballers